The Minister of Health of the Republic of Cyprus is the head of the health sector of the island.

Ministers of Health
Since the establishment of the Republic of Cyprus, 18 persons have headed the Ministry. They are:
 Androulla Agrotou
 Stavros Malas
 Niyazi Manyera
 Christos Patsalides
 Costas Kadis
 Charis Charalambous
 Andreas Gabrilides
 Dina Akkelidou
 Frixos Savides
 Christos Solomis
 Manolis Christofides
 Panikos Papageorgiou
 Christos Pelekanos
 Andreas Mikkelides
 Giorgos Tombazos
 Christos Vakis
 Zenon Severis
 Michalis Glikis
 Tassos Papadopoulos
 Stella Soulioti
 Philippos Patsalis
 George Pamporidis
Yiorgos Pamboridis, appointed 2015

References